Israel competed at the 2015 World Aquatics Championships in Kazan, Russia from 24 July to 9 August 2015.

Open water swimming

Israel has qualified two swimmers to compete in the open water marathon.

Swimming

Israeli swimmers have achieved qualifying standards in the following events (up to a maximum of 2 swimmers in each event at the A-standard entry time, and 1 at the B-standard):

Men

Women

Synchronized swimming

Israel has qualified two synchronized swimmers to compete in each of the following events.

References

External links
Israel Swimming Association 

Nations at the 2015 World Aquatics Championships
2015 in Israeli sport
2015